Come as You Are is a 2019 American comedy-drama film directed by Richard Wong and starring Grant Rosenmeyer, Hayden Szeto, Ravi Patel and Gabourey Sidibe. Produced and financed by Chicago Media Angels and The Blacklist,  it is a remake of the 2011 Belgian film Hasta la Vista. The plot concerns three friends who, along with a hired driver, set out for a brothel in Montreal that caters to people with disabilities.

Cast

Reception
The website's critics consensus reads: "Come As You Are approaches sensitive subjects with heart and humor, taking audiences on a thoroughly entertaining road trip to a crowd-pleasing destination." On Metacritic, the film has a weighted average score of 71 out of 100, based on 12 critics, indicating "generally favorable reviews".

In August 2021, during Edinburgh TV Festival's MacTaggart Lecture, British screenwriter and disability campaigner Jack Thorne cited the film as an example of ableism in the film and television industries, highlighting the lack of disabled actors in the cast.

References

External links
 
 

2019 films
Samuel Goldwyn Films films
American remakes of Belgian films
American comedy-drama films
Films about disability
2019 comedy-drama films
2010s English-language films
2010s American films